The 1967 Little All-America college football team is composed of college football players from small colleges and universities who were selected by the Associated Press (AP) as the best players at each position. For 1967, the AP selected two teams, each team having separate offensive and defensive platoons.

First team

Offense
 Quarterback - Charles McKee (senior, 6'1", 190 pounds), Lawrence
 Halfback - Don Hass (senior, 5'11", 196 pounds), Montana State
 Halfback - Carl Garrett (junior, 6'0", 215 pounds), New Mexico Highlands
 Fullback - Lee White (senior, 6'4", 232 pounds), Weber
 End - Haven Moses (senior, 6'3", 196 pounds), San Diego State
 End - DeWayne Nix (junior, 5'11", 180 pounds), Texas A&I
 Tackle - Eddie Joyner (senior, 6'1", 227 pounds), Lenoir-Rhyne
 Tackle - John Gloisten (senior, 6'5", 220 pounds), Wagner
 Guard - Spergon Wynn (senior, 6'3", 198 pounds), Lamar Tech
 Guard - Leland Hughes (senior, 6'2", 245 pounds), Delta State
 Center - Victor Bender (senior, 6'2", 230 pounds), Northeast Louisiana

Defense
 Defensive end - William Hanna (senior, 6'2", 220 pounds), Northern Arizona
 Defensive end - Jeff Queen (senior, 6'1", 230 pounds), Morgan State
 Defensive tackle - Claude Humphrey (senior, 6'5", 253 pounds), Tennessee A&I
 Defensive tackle - Dave Williams (senior, 6'0", 212 pounds), Fairmont (West Virginia)
 Middle guard - Ray Pedersen (senior, 6'3", 218 pounds), Northern Iowa
 Linebacker - Robert Beers (junior, 5'9", 220 pounds), Montana
 Linebacker - Dave Fagusa (senior, 6'2", 195 pounds), Rochester
 Linebacker - Richard Jaeger (senior, 6'3", 230 pounds), Gustavus Adolphus
 Halfback - Major Hazelton (senior, 6'1", 190 pounds), Florida A&M
 Halfback - Steve Dockery (senior, 5'11", 175 pounds), Maryville (Tennessee)
 Safety - Robert Willbanks (senior, 6'1", 184 pounds), Arlington State

Second team

Offense
 Quarterback - Bob Toledo, San Francisco State
 Halfback - Doug VanBoven, Central (Iowa)
 Halfback - Lennie Holton, Northern Michigan
 Fullback - Richard Moore, Western Kentucky
 End - Aaron Marsh, Eastern Kentucky
 End - Henry McKay, Guilford
 Tackle - Mike Donovan, Northeastern
 Tackle - Bob Deim, Arlington State (Texas)
 Guard - Tom Funches, Jacksonville State
 Guard - Willie Banks, Alcorn
 Center - James Lietzki, Mankato State

Defense
 Defensive end - Alfred Beauchamp, Southern
 Defensive end - Joe Hornak, Waynesburg
 Defensive tackle - Marvin Upshaw, Trinity (Texas)
 Defensive tackle - Arthur Shell, Maryland State
 Middle guard - Mike Tomasini, Colorado State
 Linebacker - Gary Jones, Whitman
 Linebacker - Herbert Cooper, Wesleyan
 Halfback - Mac Sauls, Southwest Texas
 Halfback - Lou Ciccone, Glassboro
 Safety - Mike Johnston, Alfred

See also
 1967 College Football All-America Team

References

Little All-America college football team
Little All-America college football team
Little All-America college football teams